Aithnen is a small settlement in Powys, Wales.

External links
Aithnen at Streetmap.co.uk

Villages in Powys